Allan Woodley (born 22 August 1935) was an Australian rules footballer who played for Hawthorn in the VFL during the 1950s. A follower, he was also known by his nickname 'The Colonel'.

Woodley began his Hawthorn career in 1954 after being recruited from Xavier College. He was chosen to represent Victoria at the 1956 Perth Carnival and won Hawthorn's Best and Fairest in 1959. In 1960 he went to England to study but returned in 1963 for one last season.

External links

1935 births
Australian rules footballers from Melbourne
Hawthorn Football Club players
Peter Crimmins Medal winners
People educated at Xavier College
Living people